Piaf or PIAF may refer to:

 Édith Piaf (1915–1963), one of France's most celebrated singers
 Musée Édith Piaf, the Piaf museum
 Piaf (play), a 1980 play by Pam Gems
 Piaf (film), a 1974 musical biographical film
 Piaf (album), a 1994 album by Elaine Paige, covering Edith Piaf
 3772 Piaf (1982 UR7), a main-belt asteroid discovered on 1982 by L. G. Karachkina
 Le Piaf, a French automobile of the 1950s
 Perth Festival, formerly Perth International Arts Festival (PIAF), Western Australia
 Privacy Impact Assessment Framework
 PHS Internet Access Forum, a consortium defining the PIAFS standard for the Japanese Personal Handyphone System

See also

 Personal Handy-phone System (PIAFS)
 
 Edith Piaf (disambiguation)